

Ladder

Ladder progress

Regular season

Squad
Dates of birth are given as of 20 December 2016, the date of the opening match of the tournament

Home attendance

References

External links
 Official website of the Brisbane Heat
 Official website of the Big Bash League

Brisbane Heat seasons